M. M. Ruhul Amin (23 December 1942 – 17 January 2017) was a Bangladeshi jurist who served as the 16th Chief Justice of Bangladesh.

Education
Amin earned his master's in history in 1963 and LLB in 1966 from the University of Dhaka.

Career
Amin joined the judicial service in 1967 and became a district judge in 1984. He worked as a district and sessions judge in four districts. He was elevated as a judge of the Appellate Division on 13 July 2003. He was appointed an additional judge of the High Court on 10 February 1994. He had been serving as the chairman of Bangladesh Judicial Service Commission since 2004.

On 1 June 2008, Amin was appointed the 16th Chief Justice of Bangladesh by  President Iajuddin Ahmed.

Amin died on  17 January 2017, while undergoing treatment at Singapore General Hospital.

References 

1942 births
2017 deaths
People from Lakshmipur District
University of Dhaka alumni
Bangladeshi judges
Supreme Court of Bangladesh justices
Chief justices of Bangladesh